Michael Moshonov (born ) is an Israeli actor, rapper, musician and TV host. Moshonov won the Ophir Award for Best Actor twice, for Lost Islands and for The Human Resources Manager. He is also known professionally as Mike Mushon.

Life and career
Moshonov was bor in Tel Aviv, Israel, to father of Bulgarian-Jewish descent, and a Romanian-born Jewish mother. He is the son of actors Moni Moshonov and Sandra Sade, and is the brother of opera singer Alma Moshonov. Moshonov's first appearance on television was in 1990 at the age of four, when he participated in the Israeli children show . In 1991, at the age of five, Moshonov played along with his father in the Israeli children film  along with Arik Einstein. In 1992 at the age of six, Moshonov participated along with his father and sister in the successful Israeli children film . In 2001 at age 15 he played in the film Late Marriage alongside his father.

Moshonov studied at the Yoram Levinstein's theater course and in 2004 he played in the Israeli film Itzik. In 2005 Moshonov became a host of the Israeli youth TV show Exit (אקזיט) alongside Ofer Shechter, Shiri Maimon and others.

Through the years Moshonov played in stage productions, films and many television series, including the Israeli drama series "Parashat Ha-Shavua" and the Israeli film Dead End. In addition, he played in Orna Porat stage production "Colors in the sand" (צבעים בחול), which is based on the life story of the Israeli painter Nahum Gutman.

In 2006, Moshonov played the title role in Raphael Nadjari's film Tehilim, which was also nominated for the Palme d'Or prize in the 2007 Cannes Film Festival.

In 2007, Moshonov played in Reshef Levi's film Lost Islands. For his performance in this film Moshonov was awarded an Ophir Award in the "Best Actor" category.

In 2008, Moshonov received a leading role in the Israeli Sci-Fi TV series Deus. That same year he played the movie "Lebanon", directed by Samuel Maoz.

In 2010, he played in Guy Nattiv's movie Mabul (also known as The Flood). For his performance in this film Moshonov was awarded an Ophir Award in the "Best Supporting Actor" category.

In 2018, Moshonov appeared as Matthew the Apostle in Helen Edmundson's film Mary Magdalene.

Moshonov is also a member of the Israeli hip-hop group "Cohen@Mushon" (כהן@מושון), in which performs along with his friend Michael Cohen.

Garden City Movement - Move On (Music Video) 

On March 24, 2014 the first music video that Moshonov directed with Lael Utnik, Mayan Toledano and edited by Gal Muggia was released on Stereogum. The music video was selected for Los Angeles Film Festival.

Filmography

Discography

Cohen@Mushon

Studio albums

Mixtapes

Music videos 
 "Move On", Garden City Movement (2014)

References

External links 

 
 

1986 births
Israeli male film actors
Israeli television presenters
Israeli male stage actors
Israeli people of Romanian-Jewish descent
Israeli people of Bulgarian-Jewish descent
21st-century Israeli male singers
Living people
21st-century Israeli male actors
20th-century Israeli male actors
Israeli male child actors
Israeli rappers
Jewish rappers